Phyllonorycter lucetiella is a moth of the family Gracillariidae. It is known from Québec in Canada and Illinois, Kentucky, Pennsylvania, Florida, Georgia, Maine, Maryland, Michigan, New York, Vermont, Connecticut and Massachusetts in the United States.

The wingspan is 6–7 mm.

The larvae feed on Ostrya virginiana and Tilia species (including Tilia americana, Tilia x vulgaris and Tilia × europaea). They mine the leaves of their host plant. The mine has the form of a tentiform mine on underside of leaf, but it is conspicuously visible on the upperside of the leaf, due to removal of green parenchyma tissue from the upper wall. The mine is rectangular, often nearly square, and placed between two veins and unwrinkled. When complete, the mine is transparent, and the pupa, which is contained in an oval cocoon, is plainly visible.

References

External links
Phyllonorycter at microleps.org
mothphotographersgroup
Bug Guide

lucetiella
Moths of North America
Moths described in 1859